Tuz may refer to:

Tuz, Montenegro, a town
Tuz Khurmatu, a town in Iraq
Tuz resmi, a tax on salt in the Ottoman Empire
Tuz SC, an Iraqi sports club
Lake Tuz, hypersaline lake in Turkey
The mascot of the 2009 linux.conf.au conference; see

See also

Tuzkol (disambiguation)
Tuzla (disambiguation)